Rashid Sharifi Sadeh (born September 21, 1984 in Sedeh Lenjan, Isfahan) is an Iranian weightlifter in the +105 kg category.

At the 2007 World Championships, he ranked 8th with a total of 410 kg.

He won the gold medal at the 2008 Asian Weightlifting Championships, with a total of 426 kg and 2009 Asian Weightlifting Championships, with a total of 440 kg, but he lost this medal because he tested positive for doping, as did fellow Iranian weightlifting team members Anoush Armak and Omid Naiij Kenar.

After retirement of the Olympic champion Hossein Rezazadeh, he succeeded him representing Iran at the 2008 Summer Olympics in Beijing. Due to his poor test results he was placed at group B of the competitions and  managed to score the first among participants without getting any medals.

Major results

Notes and references

External links
 Athlete Biography at beijing2008

1984 births
Iranian male weightlifters
Iranian strength athletes
Living people
Olympic weightlifters of Iran
Weightlifters at the 2008 Summer Olympics
Iranian sportspeople in doping cases
Doping cases in weightlifting
21st-century Iranian people